Gustavo Martins Furtado dos Santos (born 14 February 2001) is a Brazilian professional footballer who plays as a forward for Greek Super League 2 club Panathinaikos B.

References

2001 births
Living people
Association football forwards
Brazilian footballers
Brazilian expatriate footballers
Campeonato de Portugal (league) players
Liga Portugal 2 players
Super League Greece 2 players
C.D. Trofense players
Panathinaikos F.C. players
Panathinaikos F.C. B players
Brazilian expatriate sportspeople in Portugal
Expatriate footballers in Portugal
Brazilian expatriate sportspeople in Greece
Expatriate footballers in Greece